The following is a list of South Korean films released in 2020.

Box office
The highest-grossing South Korean films released in 2020, by domestic box office gross revenue, are as follows:

Released

January – March

April – June

July – September

October – December

See also
 List of South Korean films of 2019
 List of 2020 box office number-one films in South Korea
 2020 in South Korea
 Impact of the COVID-19 pandemic on cinema

References

External links 

South Korean
2020
2020 in South Korean cinema